Mount McKirdy is a mountain summit in British Columbia, Canada.

Description 

Mount McKirdy, elevation 2,586-meters (8,484-feet), is located in the Selwyn Range, which is a subrange of the Canadian Rockies. It is situated immediately east of the community of Valemount, along the Rocky Mountain Trench. Precipitation runoff from the north side of the peak drains into Swift Creek → McLennan River → Fraser River, whereas the other slopes drain to tributaries of Canoe River → Kinbasket Lake → Columbia River. Highway 5 and Canadian National Railway traverse the western base of the mountain. Cranberry Marsh also lies at the west foot of the mountain.

Etymology
The mountain's toponym was officially adopted September 8, 1975, by the Geographical Names Board of Canada, to honor Fulton Alexander McKirdy (1874–1960), an early settler in the Valemount area who staked the first homestead at the western base of the mountain along McKirdy Creek in 1906.

Climate

Based on the Köppen climate classification, Mount McKirdy is located in a subarctic climate zone with cold, snowy winters, and mild summers. Winter temperatures can drop below −20 °C with wind chill factors below −30 °C.

See also
 
 Geography of British Columbia

References

External links
 Mount McKirdy: weather forecast
 Fulton McKirdy (photo and biography): Spiralroad.com

Canadian Rockies
Two-thousanders of British Columbia
Cariboo Land District